Megan Laura Walsh (born 12 November 1994) is a professional footballer who plays as a goalkeeper for Brighton & Hove Albion of the FA Women's Super League and the Republic of Ireland women's national team.

Walsh is a product of the Aston Villa academy. She played internationally for England at all youth levels up to the under-23 side but declared for the Republic of Ireland in November 2021, for whom she is qualified by paternal descent.

Club career

Following the demise of Notts County in Spring 2017, Walsh signed for Yeovil Town for the rest of the FA WSL Spring Series. In July 2019, following Yeovil's relegation to the FA Women's National League South, Walsh remained in the WSL after signing for Brighton & Hove Albion.

International career

Walsh represented Great Britain at the 2017 Summer Universiade.

After representing England at youth levels between 2010 and 2020, it was announced that Walsh had changed her international allegiances to Ireland, eligible through her Wexford-born grandfather, having failed to receive a call up for the England senior team. She was called up for Ireland's Women's World Cup qualifiers against Slovakia and Giorgia. Walsh earned her first cap for Ireland on 19 February 2022 in a 1–0 defeat by Russia at the 2022 Pinatar Cup.

References

External links
 

1994 births
Living people
Sportspeople from Bromsgrove
English women's footballers
Women's association football goalkeepers
Aston Villa W.F.C. players
Everton F.C. (women) players
Notts County L.F.C. players
Yeovil Town L.F.C. players
England women's under-23 international footballers
FA Women's National League players
Women's Super League players
Alumni of the University of Liverpool
Brighton & Hove Albion W.F.C. players
Republic of Ireland women's international footballers
Republic of Ireland women's association footballers
English people of Irish descent
England women's youth international footballers